"Riding dirty" (or "ridin' dirty") is a phrase that refers to driving with illegal drugs present in the vehicle.

It may refer to:
 "Ridin' Dirty", the 1996 album by UGK
Ridin' (2006), a song by Chamillionaire featuring Krayzie Bone with a refrain of "tryin' to catch me ridin' dirty"